The Tegla Loroupe Peace Foundation is a peace and development organization based in Nairobi, Kenya.  It is named for Tegla Loroupe, a world-champion marathon runner from Kapenguria, Kenya.

Mission
The foundation's mission is to promote peaceful co-existence and socioeconomic development of poor and marginalized individuals and communities in Northern Kenya and the Greater Horn of Africa Region.

History and operations
Since its founding in 2003, the foundation has organized annual Peace Races across East Africa, primarily in Kenya and Uganda. Thousands of participants from tribes across the region participate in meetings, peace dialogues and athletic competitions.

Violence in the region from cattle rustling and tribal rivalries occurs across an area of tens of thousands of square kilometers.  The Peace Races draws participants from hundreds of kilometers away, with the conditions that all warriors participating must lay down their weapons and arrive at the race site prepared to join those with whom they may be at war.

Races have taken place in the Tana River area, a constant site of violent tribal and economic warfare; in Kapenguria, in West Pokot; in Moroto, in Uganda.  Tribes participating in the races include the Pokot, the Turkana, the Karamajong, the Maraquet, the Orma, and the Pokomo.

School
The foundation has built a school for orphans affected by the violence in the cattle raising areas of north-west Kenya, eastern Uganda, southern Ethiopia and southern Sudan. Now in operation for over five years, there are 270 students drawn from areas affected by regional violence.

Phase one of the curriculum will be for primary levels, with children from six years old to fourteen years old. Phase two will extend classes through higher forms.

In 2015, the Tegla Loroupe Peace Academy's top student achieved Kenya Examination score of 381.  The school is improving its ranking every year.

See also

 Economy of Kenya
 Education in Kenya
 List of companies and organizations based in Nairobi
 Tegla Loroupe Peace Race

External links 
 , the foundation's official website

2003 establishments in Kenya
Charities based in Kenya
Educational charities
Educational organisations based in Kenya
Education in Nairobi
Organisations based in Nairobi
Organizations established in 2003
Poverty-related organizations